In marketing, a coupon is a ticket or document that can be redeemed for a financial discount or rebate when purchasing a product.

Customarily, coupons are issued by manufacturers of consumer packaged goods or by retailers, to be used in retail stores as a part of sales promotions.  They are often widely distributed through mail, coupon envelopes, magazines, newspapers, the Internet (social media, email newsletter), directly from the retailer, and mobile devices such as cell phones.

The New York Times reported "more than 900 manufacturers' coupons were distributed" per household, and that "the United States Department of Agriculture estimates that four families in five use coupons. "Only about 4 percent" of coupons received were redeemed. Coupons can be targeted selectively to regional markets in which price competition is great.

Most coupons have an expiration date, although American military commissaries overseas honor manufacturers' coupons for up to six months past the expiration date.

Pronunciation
The word is of French origin, pronounced . In Britain, the United States, and Canada it is pronounced  .

History

Origin
During the great famine of 18 AH (638 CE), Umar, the second ruler of the Islamic Caliphate, introduced several reforms such as the introduction of food rationing using coupons, which were given to those in need and could be exchanged for wheat and flour.

Coca-Cola's 1888-issued "free glass of" is the earliest documented coupon. Coupons were mailed to potential customers and placed in magazines. It is estimated that between 1894 and 1913 one in nine Americans had received a free Coca-Cola, for a total of 8,500,000 free drinks. By 1895 Coke was served in every state in the United States.

In 1929, Betty Crocker began a loyalty points program and began issuing coupons that could be used to redeem for premiums like free flatware. In 1937 the coupons were printed on the outside of packages. The loyalty program ended in 2006, one of the longest loyalty programs.

In Australia consumers first came in contact with couponing when a company called Shopa Docket promoted offers and discounts on the back of shopping receipts in 1986.

Types and uses
Coupons offer different types of values, such as discounts, free shipping, buy-one get-one, trade-in for redemption, first-time customer coupons, free trial offer, launch offers, festival offers, and free giveaways. Similarly, there are varied uses of coupons which include: to incentivize a purchase, reduce a price, provide a free sample, or to aid marketers in understanding the demographics of their customer.

Function
Coupons can be used to research the price sensitivity of different groups of buyers (by sending out coupons with different dollar values to different groups). Time, location and sizes (e.g. five pound vs. 20 pound bag) affect prices; coupons are part of the marketing mix. So is knowing about the customer.

Grocery coupons
Grocery coupons come in two major types:
 store coupons: issued by the store itself. Some stores will also accept store coupons issued by competitors.
 Coupons issued by the manufacturer of a product may be used at any coupon-accepting store that carries that product. Part of their function is to advertise their offerings and attract new customers.

Some grocery stores regularly double or even triple the value of coupons to bring customers into their stores. Periodic special events double or triple coupon values on certain days or weeks.

Conveyance
Coupons exist in more than one form, and are acquired by customers in a variety of ways.

Paper
Historically, verifying the discount offered has been via presenting coupons clipped from newspapers or received in the mail. Some retailers and companies use verification methods such as unique barcodes, coupon ID numbers, holographic seals, and watermarked paper as protection from unauthorized copying or use. Other than newspapers, there are also coupon book publishers and retailers who compile vouchers and coupons into books, either for sale or free.

Electronic
By the mid-1990s, "couponing had also moved to the internet." Later on the term "downloadable coupons" came into use. Options include:
 Internet coupons: Online retailers often refer to these as "coupon codes", "promotional codes", "promotion codes", "discount codes", "keycodes", "promo codes", "surplus codes", "portable codes", "shopping codes", "voucher codes", "reward codes", "discount vouchers", "referral codes" or "source codes". These are typed in before the sale is finalized. Marketers can use different codes for different channels or groups in order to differentiate response rates. Free shipping and cashback are additional inducements. 

 Mobile: Smartphone based, these are often distributed via WAP Push over SMS or MMS, and presented at the store or online. These also have advertising benefits even after their expiration date.
 Apps: Related to classic coupons are loyalty cards; these have increasingly been superseded by mobile apps.

Taxation
Depending on the jurisdiction, coupons may or may not reduce the sales tax which must be paid by the consumer. The most consumer-friendly tax situation taxes the actual price paid, including when the store does double and triple coupon reductions.

The above applies when the retailer is the source of the coupon, since the product is offered at the post-coupon price. In jurisdictions seeking to tax more, if the coupon is issued by the manufacturer, the original price is still paid but some of the price is covered by the manufacturer instead of the consumer and the full price remains taxable.

Trading
Coupon manufacturers may or may not place restrictions on coupons limiting their transferability to ensure the coupons stay within the targeted market. Since such restrictions are not universal and are difficult and/or costly to enforce, limited coupon trading is tolerated in the industry. Organized coupon exchange clubs are commonly found in regions where coupons are distributed.
Often coupons are available for purchase at some online sites, but since most coupons are not allowed to be sold, the fee is considered to be for the time and effort put into cutting out the coupons.

Some types of coupons may be sold. The New York Times not only said "the traffic is legal" regarding selling airline discount coupons, but wrote "check the commercial notices column in The New York Times or the classified advertising section under 'Miscellaneous') in The Wall Street Journal.

During war time or economic hardships, trading or selling ration coupons is an economic crime.

See also
Canadian Tire money
Coupon (bond)
Drug coupon
Extreme Couponing
Trading stamp
Split payment

References

External links

Sales promotion
Paper products